Michael Tucker (23 August 1954 – 17 January 2012) was an Australian basketball player. He competed in the men's tournament at the 1976 Summer Olympics and the 1980 Summer Olympics.

References

1954 births
2012 deaths
Australian men's basketball players
Olympic basketball players of Australia
Basketball players at the 1976 Summer Olympics
Basketball players at the 1980 Summer Olympics
Place of birth missing